The Hilton Arts Festival is an arts festival in South Africa. It is held on the Hilton College campus each year in September and runs for four days. The festival began in 1993 and was designed to emulate the National Arts Festival in Grahamstown.

The annual Hilton Arts Festival features a program of theatre, music, dance, craft and visual art, as well as food. The Hilton College Theatre is the second largest, fixed-seated venue in KwaZulu-Natal, with a seating capacity of 486.

The festival is attended by a large number of well known local and international stars, such as Johnny Clegg.

References

Tourist attractions in KwaZulu-Natal
Theatre festivals in South Africa
Recurring events established in 1993
September events
Spring (season) events in South Africa